was a Japanese politician who served as governor of Shimane Prefecture
(1908), Nara Prefecture (1909-1913), Yamanashi Prefecture (1913-1914), Saga Prefecture (1914-1915), Kagawa Prefecture (1915-1917), Ehime Prefecture
(1917-1919), Hiroshima Prefecture from April 1919 to July 1921 and Kyoto Prefecture (1921-1922).

Governors of Hiroshima
1866 births
1941 deaths
Japanese Home Ministry government officials
Governors of Shimane Prefecture
Governors of Nara Prefecture
Governors of Yamanashi Prefecture
Governors of Saga Prefecture
Governors of Kagawa Prefecture
Governors of Ehime Prefecture
Governors of Kyoto